Ian Montgomery (born 3 May 1944) is a former Australian rules footballer who played with Collingwood in the Victorian Football League (VFL) during the 1960s.

Montgomery, in 1965, broke into the Collingwood side for the first time in round six and played every game for the rest of the year, including two finals. He made 17 appearances the following season and played from the back pocket in the 1966 VFL Grand Final, which Collingwood lost by a point.

After two more seasons at Collingwood, Montgomery embarked on a coaching career and was the first ever coach of Rythdale-Officer-Cardinia. He also spent some time as an assistant coach at Dandenong in the Victorian Football Association.

References

1944 births
Australian rules footballers from Victoria (Australia)
Collingwood Football Club players
Wangaratta Football Club players
Living people